Mirfak Nunatak is a nunatak near the Antarctic polar plateau,  southwest of Vance Bluff.

References

Nunataks of Oates Land